Meredith Duncan (born March 25, 1980) is an American professional golfer.

Duncan was born in Shreveport, Louisiana. She won the Women's Western Amateur in 2000 and 2001. She won the 2001 North and South Women's Amateur at Pinehurst. She followed this up by capturing that year's U.S. Women's Amateur in a match that the USGA says "veteran observers called the greatest final in the history of the United States Golf Association championships". She also played on the U.S. team at the 2002 Curtis Cup.

Duncan graduated from Louisiana State University in 2003 with a degree in kinesiology having turned professional in 2002.

Duncan has played on the LPGA Tour and the Futures Tour.

Duncan now works at C.E. Byrd High School in Shreveport. She serves as the head golf coach, pep squad sponsor, assistant basketball coach, physical education instructor, and kind soul.

Amateur wins (4)
2000 Women's Western Amateur
2001 Women's Western Amateur, North and South Women's Amateur, U.S. Women's Amateur

Team appearances
Amateur
Curtis Cup (representing the United States): 2002 (winners)

References

External links

American female golfers
LSU Lady Tigers golfers
LPGA Tour golfers
Winners of ladies' major amateur golf championships
Golfers from Shreveport, Louisiana
1980 births
Living people